Moria: The Dwarven City is a 1984 fantasy role-playing game supplement published by Iron Crown Enterprises for Middle-earth Role Playing.

Contents
Moria is a supplement that details the dwarf city of Moria and its inhabitants.

Reception
Andy Blakeman reviewed Moria for Imagine magazine, and stated that "Although there is a lot of interesting detail, I fear that disappointment is in store for those who buy this module because Moria is the classic dungeon adventure. I'm sorry, but It isn't."

Craig Sheeley reviewed Moria in The Space Gamer No. 75. Sheeley commented that "If you don't mind the price tag, Moria is a wonderful expansion on the information in The Fellowship of the Ring. I suggest it as a sourcebook for dwarves more than as a place of adventure; the inhabitants are too tough and the place is too big (super-sadistic GMs and doom-seeking players might like it, though . . .)."

References

Middle-earth Role Playing supplements
Role-playing game supplements introduced in 1984